Symphony No. 11 may refer to:

Symphony No. 11 (Brian) in B-flat minor by Havergal Brian, 1954
Symphony No. 11 (Diamond) by David Diamond, 1989–1991
Symphony No. 11 (Glass) by Philip Glass, 2016
Symphony No. 11 (Haydn) in E-flat major (Hoboken I/11) by Joseph Haydn, 1760–62
Symphony No. 11 (Michael Haydn) in B-flat major (Perger 9, Sherman 11, MH 82 and 184) by Michael Haydn, 1766
Symphony No. 11 (Hovhaness) (Op. 186, All Men are Brothers) by Alan Hovhaness, 1960
Symphony No. 11 (Milhaud) (Op. 384, Romantique) by Darius Milhaud, 1960
Symphony No. 11 (Mozart) in D major (K. 84/73q) by Wolfgang Amadeus Mozart, 1770
Symphony No. 11 (Myaskovsky) in B-flat minor (Op. 34) by Nikolai Myaskovsky, 1931–32
Symphony No. 11 (Pettersson)  by Allan Pettersson, 1971–73
Symphony No. 11 (Rubbra) (Op. 153, à Colette) by Edmund Rubbra
Symphony No. 11 (Shostakovich) in G minor (Op. 103, The Year 1905) by Dmitri Shostakovich, 1957
Symphony No. 11 (Simpson)  by Robert Simpson, 1990
Symphony No. 11 (Villa-Lobos) (W527) by Heitor Villa-Lobos, 1955

011